Coleophora perplexella is a moth of the family Coleophoridae. It is found in Spain and Portugal.

References

perplexella
Moths of Europe
Moths described in 1980